James Crombie may refer to:

 James Crombie (minister) (1730–1790), Scottish Presbyterian minister, founder of Belfast Academy
 James Crombie (politician) (1834–1898), politician in colonial Queensland
 James Edward Crombie (1862–1932), Scottish philanthropist, meteorologist and seismologist
 James Crombie (civil servant) (1902–1969), English civil servant
 James Mascall Morrison Crombie, Scottish lichenologist
 James Crombie (badminton), Scottish badminton player